Andreas Nödl (born February 28, 1987) is an Austrian former professional ice hockey player. He last served as captain of the Vienna Capitals of the Austrian Hockey League (EBEL). He previously played in the National Hockey League (NHL) for the Philadelphia Flyers and Carolina Hurricanes.

Playing career
As a youth, Nödl played in the 2001 Quebec International Pee-Wee Hockey Tournament with a team from Austria.

Nödl played two seasons with the Sioux Falls Stampede of the United States Hockey League (USHL) before moving on to the St. Cloud State University Huskies after being drafted in the second round, 39th overall, of the 2006 NHL Entry Draft by the Philadelphia Flyers. In his second season with the Stampede, he led the team with 59 points in 58 games. Coincidentally, Nödl is not the only Austrian-born player to play for the Stampede — Thomas Vanek, now of the Detroit Red Wings, spent three years with the club.

After starting the 2008–09 NHL season with the Flyers' farm team, the Philadelphia Phantoms, Nödl was called up to the NHL on October 21, 2008. On December 23, 2008, in a game against the Ottawa Senators, Nödl scored his first career NHL goal in a 6-4 victory.

On November 29, 2011, he was waived by the Flyers and picked up by the Carolina Hurricanes where he played for the rest of the season, as well as the following one.

After failing to secure an NHL contract and initially returning to Europe as a free agent, signing with HC Lausanne of the Swiss National League A, Nödl was released from his tryout contract prior to the season and would split the 2013–14 campaign in his native Austria with EC KAC and EC Red Bull Salzburg.

On October 16, 2014, Nödl belatedly signed on as a free agent with fellow EBEL club, the Vienna Capitals. He served as captain of the team for both the 2017–18 season and 2018–19 season.

International play
In 2009, Nödl represented Austria in the IIHF's World Championship in Switzerland.

Career statistics

Regular season and playoffs

International

Awards and honours

References

External links

 

1987 births
Living people
Adirondack Phantoms players
Austrian ice hockey right wingers
Carolina Hurricanes players
Charlotte Checkers (2010–) players
Ice hockey players at the 2014 Winter Olympics
HC TWK Innsbruck players
EC KAC players
Olympic ice hockey players of Austria
Philadelphia Flyers draft picks
Philadelphia Flyers players
Philadelphia Phantoms players
EC Red Bull Salzburg players
St. Cloud State Huskies men's ice hockey players
Sioux Falls Stampede players
Ice hockey people from Vienna
Vienna Capitals players
Austrian expatriate sportspeople in the United States
Expatriate ice hockey players in the United States
Austrian expatriate ice hockey people